Marmara Town is found in Nasarawa Local Government Area of Nasarawa State in central Nigeria. The town sits along the Keffi–Nasarawa road in the western part of Nasarawa state.

References 

Populated places in Nasarawa State